The Taara Army Base is a military installation of the Estonian Defence Forces located in Võru, in South Estonia.

History
The Taara military facilities were built between 1926 and 1928.

Structure
The Taara Army Base is the main Army facility of what used to be called the: Southern Defence District.  It accommodates the following units:
 2nd Infantry Brigade (HQ in Tartu)

 Kuperjanov Infantry Battalion — currently engaged in training the rest of the forces that will make up the 2nd Brigade.
 Combat Service Support Battalion

The 2nd Infantry Brigade will continue to activate further units to reach full strength by 2022 at the latest.

See also
Tapa Army Base
Ämari Air Base

References

Military installations of Estonia
Buildings and structures in Võru County